Osmosis Jones is a 2001 American live-action/animated buddy cop crime action comedy film written by Marc Hyman. Combining live-action sequences directed by the Farrelly brothers and animation directed by Piet Kroon and Tom Sito, the film stars the voices of Chris Rock, Laurence Fishburne, David Hyde Pierce, Brandy Norwood, and William Shatner alongside Molly Shannon, Chris Elliott, and Bill Murray in live-action roles. It follows the title character, an anthropomorphic white blood cell, as he teams up with a cold pill to protect his unhealthy human host from a deadly virus.

The film premiered on August 7, 2001, and was released theatrically three days later. It received mixed reviews from critics, who praised the world building, the animation, story, and voice performances, but criticized the inconsistent tone of the live-action portions and overuse of gross-out humor. The film was also a commercial failure, grossing $14 million worldwide against a $70 million budget. Despite the poor financial response, the film was followed by the animated television series Ozzy & Drix, which aired on Kids' WB from 2002 to 2004.

Plot

Frank DeTorri is an unhealthy, lazy zookeeper at Sucat Memorial Zoo in Rhode Island. He copes with the death of his wife Maggie by overeating and foregoing basic hygiene, much to his daughter Shane's embarrassment. Inside his body, called the "City of Frank" by its anthropomorphic inhabitants, white blood cell Osmosis "Ozzy" Jones is a quick-witted officer of the Frank Police Department whose attempts to catch germs end up causing trouble in Frank's body.

Desperate to be re-elected, the corrupt Mayor Phlegmming doubles down on his junk food policies, ignoring their effect on Frank's health. This induces Frank to eat a boiled egg that fell into a chimpanzee's habitat, allowing Thrax, a virus known as "La Muerte Roja" ("The Red Death"), to enter his body. To placate his secretary Leah Estrogen, Phlegmming instructs Frank to take a cold pill, Special Agent Drixenol "Drix" Drixobenzometaphedramine, who disinfects the throat but unknowingly covers up evidence of Thrax's arrival. Ozzy is ordered to assist Drix's investigation while Thrax takes over a gang of sweat germs run by local crime boss Scabies and attacks the dam in Frank's nose, nearly killing Drix before Ozzy rescues him.

Ozzy and Drix get into an argument, but after Ozzy reveals Thrax and his gang as the cause of the mucus dam breakage, Drix sticks with Ozzy. Ozzy tells Drix the reason for his "record": Ozzy induced Frank to vomit a contaminated oyster onto Shane's teacher, Mrs. Boyd, causing Frank to be fired from his previous job at the pea soup factory and banned from visiting Shane's school, and Ozzy was demoted to patrol duty in the mouth for his role in the public humiliation. Drix agrees with Ozzy that he did the right thing, and the two pay a visit to Ozzy's informant, Chill, a flu vaccine cell who directs them to Thrax's hideout – a germ-ridden nightclub in a large zit on Frank's forehead. Ozzy goes undercover and infiltrates the gang, learning that Thrax, wanting to be known as the most dangerous virus in medical history, intends to masquerade as a common cold and use his knowledge of DNA to kill Frank within forty-eight hours. When Ozzy is discovered, Drix comes to his aid, causing a brawl which culminates in the zit being popped by a grenade. The pus lands on Mrs. Boyd's lip during a conversation with Frank, foiling his chance to apologize. Furious, Phlegmming closes the investigation, dismisses Ozzy from the force, and orders Drix to leave.

Having survived the zit's destruction, Thrax kills his remaining henchmen, Bruiser and Joe Cramp, and attacks the hypothalamus, stealing a crucial nucleotide before abducting Leah and preparing to flee via the mouth. His actions cause Frank to develop a high fever, prompting his brother, Bob, to take him to the hospital, to Phlegmming's dismay. Ozzy discovers Thrax is alive and convinces Drix to stay. They reach Thrax in the uvula and rescue Leah, but Thrax uses pollen to induce Frank to sneeze him out of the mouth. Drix launches Ozzy after him, and they land on Shane's cornea. As they fight, falling onto one of Shane's false eyelashes, Ozzy tricks Thrax into trapping his hand in the lash and escapes as the lash falls into a beaker of rubbing alcohol, dissolving Thrax.

As Frank's temperature surpasses , he goes into cardiac arrest. Riding one of Shane's tears back to Frank's body, Ozzy revives him with the stolen nucleotide and Frank tells Shane "Mom says 'Hi.'" Congratulated as a hero and welcomed back into the police force, Ozzy enters a relationship with Leah, while Drix is allowed to stay as his new partner. Frank commits to a healthier lifestyle, leading Phlegmming to lose the election in a landslide to his opponent, Tom Colonic. Reduced to janitorial duty in the bowels, Phlegmming foolishly ignores a notice not to push a button that triggers Frank's flatulence, ejecting himself from the body.

Cast

Voice cast
 Chris Rock as Osmosis "Ozzy" Jones, a quick-witted white blood cell with an impulsive personality.
 Laurence Fishburne as Thrax, an extremely deadly pathogenic agent.
 David Hyde Pierce as Special Agent Drixenol "Drix" Drixobenzometaphedramine, a by-the-book cold pill who becomes Ozzy's partner.
 Brandy Norwood as Leah Estrogen, Mayor Phlegmming's secretary and Ozzy's love interest.
 William Shatner as Mayor Phlegmming, the arrogant, incompetent and corrupt mayor of the City of Frank.
 Ron Howard as Tom Colonic, Phlegmming's rival for the mayoralty of the City of Frank.

Twisted Brown Trucker members Kid Rock, Kenny Olsen, Jason Krause, Joe C., Stefanie Eulinberg, Jimmie "Bones" Trombly, and Uncle Kracker provide the voices of the fictional band "Kidney Rock". Joel Silver makes an uncredited appearance as the police chief. Additional voices are provided by Jonathan Adams, Carlos Alazraqui, Eddie Barth, Rodger Bumpass, Paul Christie, Antonio Fargas, Eddie Frierson, Donald Fullilove, Jackie Gonneau, Richard Steven Horvitz, Rif Hutton, Joyce Kurtz, Anne Lockhart, Sherry Lynn, Danny Mann, Mickie McGowan, "Stuttering" John Melendez, Paul Pape, Chris Phillips, Al Rodrigo, Herschel Sparber, Doug Stone, Steve Susskind, and Robert Wisdom.

Live-action
 Bill Murray as Frank DeTorri, Shane's widowed father and Bob's brother.
 Molly Shannon as Mrs. Boyd, Shane's science and P.E. teacher.
 Chris Elliott as Bob DeTorri, Frank's brother and Shane's uncle.
 Elena Franklin as Shane DeTorri, Frank's 10-year-old daughter and Bob's niece.

Production

Osmosis Jones went through development hell during production. The animated sequences, directed by Tom Sito and Piet Kroon, went into production as planned even being completed ahead of schedule, but acquiring both a director and a star actor for the live-action sequences took a considerable amount of time, until Bill Murray was cast as the main character of Frank, and Peter and Bobby Farrelly stepped in to direct the live-action sequences. As part of their contract, the Farrelly brothers are credited as the primary directors of the film, although they did no supervision of the animated portions of the film. Will Smith was interested in the part of Ozzy, but in the end his schedule would not permit it.

Principal photography on the live-action scenes took place from April 2 to June 19, 2000 in Plymouth, Massachusetts.

Osmosis Jones was originally rated PG-13 by the MPAA for "crude language" and "bodily humor" in 2000. However, Warner Bros. edited the film to make it family-friendly; and in 2001 when it was released, the film was re-rated PG on appeal for "bodily humor".

Release

Marketing
The first trailer for Osmosis Jones was released in front of Pokémon 3: The Movie on April 6, 2001, and contains a classical masterpiece from Stanley Kubrick's film 2001: A Space Odyssey.

Home media 
Osmosis Jones was released on VHS and DVD on November 13, 2001.

Reception

Box office
Osmosis Jones had its world premiere screening on August 7, 2001, at the Grauman's Egyptian Theatre before being widely released on August 10, 2001, in 2,305 theaters worldwide. Upon its original release, the film was a financial stump and was the penultimate project produced by Warner Bros. Feature Animation (preceded by The Iron Giant and followed by Looney Tunes: Back in Action, which both also failed at the box office upon their original releases). The film opened at #7 in its first opening weekend at the U.S. box office, accumulating $5,271,248 on its opening week. The film soon grossed $13,596,911. The film was a box office bomb, unable to recover its $70 million production budget.

Critical response
On Rotten Tomatoes, Osmosis Jones has an approval rating of 56% based on 111 reviews, with an average rating of 5.5/10. The site's critical consensus reads, "The animated portion of Osmosis is zippy and fun, but the live-action portion is lethargic." On Metacritic, the film has a weighted average score of 57 out of 100, based on 28 critics, indicating "mixed or average reviews". Audiences polled by CinemaScore gave the film an average grade of "B−" on an A+ to F scale.

The animated parts of Osmosis Jones were praised for their plot and fast pace, in contrast with the criticized live action segments. Robert Koehler of Variety praised the film for its animated and live-action segments intervening, claiming it to be "the most extensive interplay of live-action and animation since Who Framed Roger Rabbit". The New York Times wrote "the film, with its effluvia-festival brand of humor, is often fun, and the rounded, blobby rendering of the characters is likable. But the picture tries too hard to be offensive to all ages. I suspect that even the littlest viewers will be too old for that spit." Roger Ebert gave the film 3 out of 4 and wrote: "Likely to entertain kids, who seem to like jokes about anatomical plumbing. For adults, there is the exuberance of the animation and the energy of the whole movie, which is just plain clever."

The use of gross-out humor in the film's live-action sequences, as seen in most films directed by the Farrelly brothers, was widely criticized. As such, Lisa Alspector of the Chicago Reader described the film as a "cathartically disgusting adventure movie". Maitland McDonagh of TV Guide praised the film's animation and its glimpse of intelligence although did criticize the humor as being "so distasteful". Lisa Schwarzbaum of Entertainment Weekly felt that the film had a diverse premise as it "oscillates between streaky black comedy and sanitary instruction"; however the scatological themes were again pointed out. Jonathan Foreman of New York Post claimed Osmosis Jones to have generic plotting, saying that "It's no funnier than your average grade-school biology lesson and less pedagogically useful than your typical Farrelly brothers comedy." Michael Sragow of Baltimore Sun praised David Hyde Pierce's performance as Drix, claiming him to be "hilarious" and "a take-charge dose of medicine".

The film received numerous Annie Award nominations including Best Animated Feature (losing to Shrek).

Soundtrack

A soundtrack containing hip hop and R&B music was released on August 7, 2001, by Atlantic Records. The soundtrack failed to chart on the Billboard 200, but Trick Daddy's single "Take It to da House" managed to make it to number 88 on the Billboard Hot 100 singles chart.

Cancelled sequel
In December 2002, it was announced that a sequel titled Osmosis Jones 2 would be released, with the film focused on Ozzy's daughter named Jebe. It was later cancelled.

See also

 Once Upon a Time... Life, an animated series with similar anthropomorphic representations of cells and germs.
 Ozzy & Drix, an animated series that serves as a continuation of the film.
 Cells at Work!, a Japanese manga/anime series with a similar premise.
 Inner Workings, a Disney short film that is set in the human body.
 Inside Out, a Pixar computer-animated film that is set inside the human brain.

References

External links

 
 

 
2001 films
2001 animated films
2001 action comedy films
2001 directorial debut films
2000s buddy comedy films
2000s buddy cop films
2000s American animated films
American films with live action and animation
American action comedy films
American buddy comedy films
American buddy cop films
Fictional microorganisms
American dark fantasy films
Films about immunity
Films about father–daughter relationships
Films about infectious diseases
Films adapted into television shows
Films directed by the Farrelly brothers
Films with screenplays by Marc Hyman
Films scored by Randy Edelman
Films set in Rhode Island
Films shot in Massachusetts
Human body in popular culture
American black comedy films
Warner Bros. films
Warner Bros. animated films
Warner Bros. Animation animated films
2000s English-language films